is a micro-asteroid, classified as a near-Earth object of the Apollo group, approximately  in diameter. It was first observed on 20 January 2018, by astronomers of the Catalina Sky Survey at Mount Lemmon Observatory in Arizona, United States, the day after the closest flyby, due to its approach from the direction of the Sun.

Description 

 orbits the Sun at a distance of 0.8–2.3 AU once every 23 months (706 days; semi-major axis of 1.55 AU). Its orbit has an eccentricity of 0.48 and an inclination of 12° with respect to the ecliptic. With an aphelion of 2.3 AU, it is a Mars-crosser, crossing the orbit of the Red Planet at 1.666 AU. It is also an Earth-crosser, as are all Apollo asteroids. The body's observation arc begins at Mount Lemmon with its first observation on 20 February 2018.

2018 flyby 

On 19 January 2018, the object passed at a nominal distance of only  from Earth. This corresponds to 0.63 LD. Close approaches are projected for 28 October 2019 and 26 August 2021, both at a much larger distance (0.24 AU).

Physical characteristics 

As of 2018, no rotational lightcurve of this object has been obtained from photometric observations. The asteroids's rotation period, pole and shape remain unknown.

Numbering and naming 

This minor planet has not yet been numbered.

See also
 List of asteroid close approaches to Earth in 2018

References

External links 

 
 
 

Minor planet object articles (unnumbered)
Discoveries by the Catalina Sky Survey
Near-Earth objects in 2018
20180120